Nnenna Freelon (born July 28, 1954) is an American jazz singer, composer, producer, and arranger.

Early life and education
Freelon was born Chinyere Nnenna Pierce to Charles and Frances Pierce in Cambridge, Massachusetts, where she was raised. She has a brother Melvin and a sister named Debbie. As a young woman, she sang extensively in her community and the Union Baptist Church and at St. Paul AME. She recalled, "I started singing in the church, like so many others...." Nnenna graduated from Simmons College in Boston with a degree in health care administration. For a while she worked for the Durham County Hospital Corporation, Durham, North Carolina.

She suggests that her influences included several "not famous people" and well as Nina Simone and Billy Eckstine, whose records her parents played at home. "It's important to expose your children to a wide musical environment," she says. "I did something that my grandmother told me: 'Bloom where you're planted', 'don't get on a bus and go to New York or L.A., sing where you are'."

Career

In 1990, Nnenna Freelon went to the Southern Arts Federation's jazz meeting and met Ellis Marsalis. "That was a big turning point. At that time, I had been singing for seven years. Ellis is an educator and he wanted to nurture and help. What I didn't know at the time was that George Butler of Columbia Records was looking for a female singer. Ellis asked me for a package of materials. I had my little local press kit and my little tape with original music. Two years later, I was signed to Columbia Records." She was in her late 30s when she made her debut CD, Nnenna Freelon, for Columbia in 1992. The label dropped her in 1994, and Concord Records signed her in 1996.

She has worked with  Ray Charles, Ellis Marsalis, Al Jarreau, Anita Baker, Aretha Franklin, Dianne Reeves, Diana Krall, Ramsey Lewis, George Benson, Clark Terry, Herbie Hancock, and Terence Blanchard. She has performed at Carnegie Hall, Hollywood Bowl, Ellington Jazz Festival, Monterey Jazz Festival, Apollo Theater, Montreux Jazz Festival, John F. Kennedy Center for the Performing Arts.

Babysong workshops
Freelon is the national spokesperson for the National Association of Partners in Education, an organization with over 400,000 school and community partnership programs across the United States, dedicated to arts education. Freelon has maintained ties to her hospital-work as her jazz career has flourished. Her Babysong workshops, which she started at Duke University Medical Center in 1990, teach young mothers and healthcare providers the importance of the human voice for healing and nurturing. She emphasizes the importance of parents singing to children to enhance brain development.

Personal life
In 1979, she married architect Philip Freelon. She and her husband raised three children, Deen, Maya and Pierce, before she decided to perform professionally as a jazz singer. Their son Pierce Freelon is a hip hop artist, a Visiting Professor of Political Science at North Carolina Central University and the founder of the website Blackademics, for which he has interviewed many notable figures such as Angela Davis, Maya Angelou, Nikki Giovanni, and Jesse Jackson. Deen Freelon is an associate professor in the Hussman School of Journalism and Media at the University of North Carolina at Chapel Hill studying social media and politics. Daughter Maya Freelon Asante is a visual artist.

Awards and honors
 Eubie Blake Award, Eubie Blake National Jazz Institute
 Billie Holiday Award, Académie du Jazz

Discography

Grammy history

References

External links
Official site
Review of Blueprint of a Lady at Jazz Chicago

1954 births
Living people
Singers from Massachusetts
Simmons University alumni
African-American jazz musicians
American jazz singers
20th-century African-American women singers
American women jazz singers
Traditional pop music singers
21st-century American women